The American National Biography (ANB) is a 24-volume biographical encyclopedia set that contains about 17,400 entries and 20 million words, first published in 1999 by Oxford University Press under the auspices of the American Council of Learned Societies.

Background
A 400-entry supplement appeared in 2002. Additional funding came from the Rockefeller Foundation, the Andrew W. Mellon Foundation and the National Endowment for the Humanities.

The ANB bills itself as the successor of the Dictionary of American Biography, which was first published between 1926 and 1937. It is not, however, a strict superset of this older publication; the selection of topics was made anew.

It is commonly available in the reference sections of United States libraries, and is available online by subscription (see external links).

Awards and reception 
In 1999, the American Library Association awarded the American National Biography its Dartmouth Medal as a reference work of outstanding quality and significance.  The American Historical Association's Waldo G. Leland Prize was awarded for 2001.

It has been criticized for missing cross references and occasional errors, and for its cost, which is said to limit availability in poor countries.

Selected access 

   (full set);  (full set);  &  (full set).
 General editors: John Arthur Garraty, PhD (1920–2007) & Mark Christopher Carnes, PhD (born 1950)

Volumes via Internet Archive (full access, free, with registration)

Volumes via Google Books

Via online 

  .

See also
Oxford Biography Index
The National Cyclopaedia of American Biography

Bibliography

Notes

References

 
 
  ; ; .

 

  ; ; .

  ; ; .

  ; ; .

  ; .

External links

1999 non-fiction books
United States biographical dictionaries
History books about the United States
Oxford University Press reference books